The Uganda Local Governments’ Association (ULGA) is the National Association of Local Governments of Uganda. It is a private, voluntary and non-profit body.

History

ULGA was established as Uganda Local Authorities Association (ULAA) in 1994. 
This was at a time when the Ugandan government had started the Decentralization Policy and was in the process of drawing up the new Constitution of 1995.

The District Chairpersons at the time, led by Hon.C.G Kiwanuka-Musisi who at that time was Chairperson of greater Mukono District Council and representing their respective Local Governments, established the Uganda Local Authorities Association (ULAA) on 14 April 1994 at Uganda Management Institute, Kampala to lobby and advocate for their members with a stronger voice, and in order to address Local Governments’ concerns within a wider context. 
On 1 October 2004, at their Annual General Meeting in Mbarara, the ULAA members agreed to change the name of their Association to Uganda Local Governments Association (ULGA), to embrace the concerns of all LGs, even those coming from affiliate members.

Legal status
ULGA is a registered legal entity with a mandate guided by its Constitution, and belongs to its constituent local governments as members. ULGA was formed to represent and advocate for the constitutional rights and interests of Local Governments and to act as the negotiating agency for its members.

Mandate
ULGA's mandate is to unite Local Governments, and provide them with Association member services, as well as a forum through which to come together and give each other support and guidance to make common positions on key issues that affect Local Governance. ULGA carries out this mandate through lobbying, advocacy and representation of Local Governments at local, national and international fora.

Although ULGA is not an organ of Government, the role of the Association is implied and recognized by the state in a number of arrangements. These include; appointment by His Excellency the President of Members onto the Local Government Finance Commission (LGFC), active participation in Sector Negotiations on the Conditional Grants with Sector Ministries, active participation in the Decentralisation Policy Strategy Framework (DPSF) and the Local Government Sector Investment Plan (LGSIP), and through representation of local governments and their interests in national for a such as the Northern Uganda Social Action Fund (NUSAF) and National Agricultural Research Organisation (NARO), Public Sector Management working Group (PSM-WG), Decentralisation Management Technical Working Group (DMTWG)  among others.

Objectives
The objectives of ULGA as stipulated in its Strategic Corporate plan of 2010-2014, an instrument that guides ULGA's planning, budgeting and resource allocation are:

 To support a strong ULGA uniting and representing the interests of members and providing them with efficient and effective services
 Trusted Local Governments performing their mandated functions in an accountable and transparent manner
 To ensure a conducive policy, legal and regulatory framework for decentralisation and operation of LGs

Membership
Every District and Lower Local Government Council is eligible to become a member of the Association upon passing a council resolution, adopting the constitution and payment of membership and subscription fees.

There are two categories of members, the District Councils as Higher Local Governments and Municipalities, Sub counties and Town councils as Lower Local Governments. Currently all the One Hundred and Eleven (111) Districts and over Eight Hundred (800) Lower Local Governments are members of ULGA. Membership fees are paid once and annual subscription fees, depending on the Districts structural model, as established by the Ministry of Public Service.

The ULGA Constitution recognizes Affiliate organizations as part of its membership structure. Through the Secretariat, the Association coordinates and where possible helps to co-finance the activities of these bodies. The current affiliate Associations include the Association of District Speakers (UDICOSA), the Association of Chief Administrative Officers (ALGAOU), and the Association of Chief Finance Officers (CFO's).The Secretariat staff are attached to the different bodies to assist them perform their functions.

Structure and Management

The Association is able to meet its objectives through a number of organs. These include: the Annual General Meeting, the Executive Committee, the Ethics and Accountability Committee and the National Secretariat.

Annual General Meeting
This is the supreme Policy Organ of the Association which takes place once every year. The Assembly is composed of local government representatives: all District Chairpersons, all District Speakers of Councils, all District Chief Administrative Officers, and Sub County Chairpersons' representatives.  The AGM is preceded by Regional Meetings – organized by the Regional Representatives. There are also special and extraordinary general meetings convened as and when necessary and this clearly spelt out in the provisions of the ULGA Constitution. It is the responsibility of the respective District Local Governments to facilitate its representatives and ensure their full participation in these meetings. It is also the responsibility of the District Chairpersons and Chief Administrative Officers to assist Lower Local Governments to organize and select one LCIII Chairperson to represent them at the AGM.

Standing Committees
The Ethics and Accountability Committee is appointed by the Annual General Meeting and has tenure of two and half years. The Committee is mandated to oversee the implementation of the ULGA Charter on Accountability and Ethical Code of Conduct

National Executive Committee
Every two (2) years, the AGM elects a National Executive Committee (NEC) that consists of 22 members. This organ gives directive and guidance to the Secretariat. They oversee implementation of the budget and policies established by the AGM and give the necessary political backup to staff for the various interactions with stakeholders and the government. The Executive Committee meets quarterly under the Chairmanship of the President at a suitable and affordable venue. Their mandate involves receiving quarterly activity status reports and financial performance briefs of the previous quarter from the Secretary General and approving the Work plan and expenditures of the new quarter. The committee consists of:

 A President
 A Vice-President
 5 Regional District Chairpersons
 5 Chief Administrative Officers to represent their respective Regions
 5 District Speakers to represent their respective regions
 5 Sub County Chairpersons to represent their respective regions

Regional Structure
ULGA has a Structure with 5 Regions from which the members of the Executive Committee are elected and these are: Northern Region, Eastern Region, Karamoja Region, Western Region and Central Region.  Regional "offices" (not buildings) have been established in the Regions with the purpose of facilitating ULGA's Regional representation, flow of information from members to the headquarters and training. The Regional branches are headed by the Regional Chairperson who must be a District Chairperson. The Secretariat staff are attached to the Regions to provide technical and other necessary support.

Executive Sub-Committees
The representation of the members of the sub committees is from the Executive Committee members. Each Sub Committee is represented by One Chairperson (apart from the Public Relations and Finance Committee where President and Vice President are members respectively), One Speaker, One Chief Administrative Officer and One Sub county Chairperson.

 Finance and Management Sub-Committee
 Training and Capacity Building Sub-Committee
 Human Rights, Peace and Conflict Resolution Sub-Committee
 HIV/AIDS, Gender, Disability and Environment Sub-Committee
 International and Public Relations Sub-Committee

ULGA Negotiation and Advocacy Team (UNAT)
ULGA has a Negotiation and Advocacy Team, which includes members outside the National Executive Committee. The Urban Councils and Lower Local Government Representatives in particular are part of the UNAT in order to enhance articulation of issues affecting all levels of Local Governments.  The UNAT is primarily responsible for the Annual Negotiations on the Conditional Grants with Line Ministries but it may also be activated for other fields of advocacy and negotiation.

The members are
 President ULGA (Chair)
 Chairperson UAAU (Co-chair)
 Vice President ULGA (Member)
 Vice-Chairperson UAAU	(Member)
 Chairperson of ULGA's Finance Committee (Member)
 Honorary Secretary UAAU (Member)
 Chairperson Speakers’ Association (Member)
 Chairperson CAO's Association	(Member)
 Chairperson Town Clerks’ Association	(Member)
 Representative of Town Councils (Member) 
 Chairperson, Urban Divisions’ Association (Member)
 Representative of Sub-counties (Member)
 Chairperson of CFOs in Districts (Member)
 Chairperson of CFOs in Urban areas (Member)

Secretariat
The Secretariat is the implementing arm of the Association responsible for the day-to-day management. It is headed by the Secretary General, who is assisted by Heads of Directorate, Professional, Senior and Junior Officers and support staff. (A total of 20 full-time Staff) This team is supported from time to time by Consultants/Technical Assistants and student interns from different Universities.

Financing
ULGA's financing is mainly by the members’ contributions and donations by well-wishers and Development partners, including DANIDA, DFID, USAID, EU, VNG, among others. The secretariat also undertakes consultancy services.

References

External links
Uganda Local Governments Association (ULGA)

Local government organizations
Local government in Uganda
Government agencies established in 1994
Political organisations based in Uganda
Decentralization